Electroacoustic music is a genre of popular and Western art music in which composers use technology to manipulate the timbres of acoustic sounds, sometimes by using audio signal processing, such as reverb or harmonizing, on acoustical instruments. It originated around the middle of the 20th century, following the incorporation of electric sound production into compositional practice. Practical electronic music instruments began to appear in the early 20th century.

Tape music

Tape music is an integral part of musique concrète, which uses the tape recorder as its central musical source. The music can utilise pre-recorded sound fragments and the creation of loops, which can be altered and manipulated through techniques such as editing and playback speed manipulation. The work of Halim El-Dabh is perhaps the earliest example of tape (or, in this case, Wire recording) music. El-Dabh's The Expression of Zaar, first presented in Cairo, Egypt, in 1944, was an early work using musique concrète–like techniques similar to those developed in Paris during the same period. El-Dabh would later become more famous for his work at the Columbia-Princeton Electronic Music Center, where in 1959 he composed the influential piece Leiyla and the Poet.

Composer John Cage's assembly of the Williams Mix serves as an example of the rigors of tape music. First, Cage created a 192-page score. Over the course of a year, 600 sounds were assembled and recorded. Cut tape segments for each occurrence of each sound were accumulated on the score. Then the cut segments were spliced to one of eight tapes, work finished on January 16, 1953. The premiere performance (realization) of the 4'15" work was given on March 21, 1953, at the University of Illinois, Urbana.

Electronic music

In Cologne, elektronische Musik, pioneered in 1949–51 by the composer Herbert Eimert and the physicist Werner Meyer-Eppler, was based solely on electronically generated (synthetic) sounds, particularly sine waves. The beginning of the development of electronic music has been traced back to "the invention of the valve [vacuum tube] in 1906". The precise control afforded by the studio allowed for what Eimert considered to be the subjection of everything, "to the last element of the single note", to serial permutation, "resulting in a completely new way of composing sound"; in the studio, serial operations could be applied to elements such as timbre and dynamics. The common link between the two schools is that the music is recorded and performed through loudspeakers, without a human performer. The majority of electroacoustic pieces use a combination of recorded sound and synthesized or processed sounds, and the schism between Schaeffer's and Eimert's approaches has been overcome, the first major example being Karlheinz Stockhausen's Gesang der Jünglinge of 1955–56.

Circuit bending
Circuit bending is the creative short-circuiting of low voltage, battery-powered electronic audio devices such as guitar effects, children's toys and small synthesizers to create new musical instruments and sound generators. Emphasizing spontaneity and randomness, the techniques of circuit bending have been commonly associated with noise music, though many more conventional contemporary musicians and musical groups have been known to experiment with "bent" instruments.

Examples of notable works
 Milton Babbitt – Philomel (1964)
 Luciano Berio – Thema (Omaggio a Joyce) (1958–59)
 Johanna Beyer – Music of the Spheres (1938)
 Konrad Boehmer – Aspekt (1964–66), Apocalipsis cum figuris (1984)
 Pierre Boulez – Répons (1981–84)
 John Cage – Imaginary Landscape No. 1 (1939)
 Mario Davidovsky – Synchronisms No. 6 for Piano and Electronic Sound (1970)
 Halim El-Dabh – Leiyla and the Poet (1961)
 Karel Goeyvaerts – Nummer 5 met zuivere tonen (1953)
 Jean-Michel Jarre – Deserted Palace (1972)
 Phil Kline – Unsilent Night (1992), for cassettes in boomboxes
 Gottfried Michael Koenig – Project 1 (1964), Project 2 (1966)
 Alvin Lucier – I Am Sitting in a Room (1969)
 Ivo Malec – Triola, ou Symphonie pour moi-même (1977–78)
 Luigi Nono – La fabbrica illuminata (1964), A floresta é jovem e cheia de vida (1966), Contrappunto dialettico alla mente (1968), Como una ola de fuerza y luz (1971–72)
 Pauline Oliveros – Sonic Meditations, "Teach Yourself to Fly" (1961)
 Else Marie Pade – Symphonie Magnétophonique (1958)
 Henri Pousseur – Scambi (1957), Trois Visages de Liège (1961), Paraboles-Mix (1972), Seize Paysages planétairesl (2000)
 Steve Reich – Pendulum Music (1968), for microphones, amplifiers, speakers and performers
 Pierre Schaeffer – Cinq études de bruits (1948)
 Karlheinz Stockhausen – Gesang der Jünglinge (1955–56), Kontakte (1958–60), Mixtur (1964), Mikrophonie I & II (1964 and 1965), Telemusik (1966), Hymnen (1966–67), Oktophonie (1991), Cosmic Pulses (2006–2007)
 James Tenney – For Ann (rising) (1969)
 Edgard Varèse – Poème électronique (1958)
 Charles Wuorinen – Time's Encomium (1969)
 Iannis Xenakis – Persepolis (1971)

Electronic and electroacoustic instruments

 Birotron (1974), Dave Biro
 Buchla 100 and 200 serie (1960s–70s), Buchla Lightning I (1991) and Buchla Lightning II (1995) by Don Buchla
 Cembaphon (1951), Harald Bode
 Chamberlin (1946)
 Clavinet
 Clavioline (early 1950s) and Concert Clavioline (1953), Harald Bode
 Clavivox, Circle Machine, Bass Line Generator, Rhythm Modulator, Bandito the Bongo Artist, and Electronium (1950s–60s), Raymond Scott
 DX7 (1983), Yamaha
 Elektronium (in German)
 EMS Synthi AKS (1972)
 Fairlight CMI (1978)
 Gravikord (1986), Robert Grawi
 Kraakdoos / Cracklebox (1960s–70s), Michel Waisvisz
 Mellotron (1960s)
 Melochord (1947–49), Harald Bode
 Melodium (1938), Harald Bode
 Moog synthesizer (1965), Robert Moog
 Ondioline (1939), Georges Jenny
 Optigan (1971)
 Orchestron (1975), Vako Synthesizers
 Polychord (1950) and Polychord III (1951), Harald Bode
 Electronic Sackbut (1945), Hugh Le Caine
 Sampler (musical instrument)
 Synclavier (1975), Jon Appleton, Sydney A. Alonso and Cameron Jones
 Telharmonium (1897), Thaddeus Cahill
 Theremin (1928), Leon Theremin
 Tuttivox (1953), Harald Bode
 UPIC (1977), Iannis Xenakis and CEMAMu
 Warbo Formant organ (1937), Harald Bode

Centers, associations and events for electroacoustics and related arts
Important centers of research and composition can be found around the world, and there are numerous conferences and festivals which present electroacoustic music, notably the International Computer Music Conference, the international conference on New Interfaces for Musical Expression, the Electroacoustic Music Studies Conference, and the Ars Electronica Festival (Linz, Austria).

A number of national associations promote the art form, notably the Canadian Electroacoustic Community (CEC) in Canada, the Society for Electro-Acoustic Music in the United States (SEAMUS) in the US, the Australasian Computer Music Association in Australia and New Zealand, and Sound and Music (previously the Sonic Arts Network) in the UK. The Computer Music Journal and Organised Sound are the two most important peer-reviewed journals dedicated to electroacoustic studies, while several national associations produce print and electronic publications.

Festivals

There have been a number of festivals that feature electroacoustic music. Early festivals such as Donaueschingen Festival, founded in 1921, were some of the first to include electroacoustic instruments and pieces. This was followed by ONCE Festival of New Music in the 1950s, and since the 1960s there has been a growth of festivals that focus exclusively on electroacoustic music.

60x60 (Intl.)
Ars Electronica (Austria)
Berlin Atonal (Germany)
Cybersonica (UK)
Dias de Música Electroacústica (Intl.)
Electro-music (UK)
Electroacoustic Music Days (Greece)
Electronic Music Midwest (US)
Electrofringe (Australia)
Expo '70 (Japan)
International Computer Music Conference (Intl.)
International Electroacoustic Music Festival (Cuba)
Les Siestes Electroniques (France)
Music For People & Thingamajigs Festival (US)
New Interfaces for Musical Expression (Int.)
Numusic (Norway)
NWEAMO (US)
Olympia Experimental Music Festival (US)
ONCE Festival of New Music (US)
Présences Électroniques (France)
Pro Musica Nova (Germany)
Spark Festival (US)
TodaysArt (The Netherlands)

Conferences and symposiums
Alongside paper presentations, workshops and seminars, many of these events also feature concert performances or sound installations created by those attending or which are related to the theme of the conference / symposium.

See also
Acousmatic music
Computer music
Digital signal processing
Experimental music
International Documentation of Electroacoustic Music
Japanoise
List of acousmatic-music composers
Live electronic music
Sonology
Sound recording and reproduction
Sound art

References

Works cited

Further reading

 Anon. 2007. "Untitled". The Wire 275–280.
Beecroft, Norma. 2009. "Electronic Music in Toronto and Canada in the Analogue Era." eContact! 11.2 – Figures canadiennes (2) / Canadian Figures (2) (July 2009). Montréal: CEC.
Chadabe, Joel. 1997. Electric Sound: The Past and Promise of Electronic Music. Upper Saddle River, New Jersey: Prentice Hall. .
Doornbusch, P. 2015. "A Chronology / History of Electronic and Computer Music and Related Events 1906 – 2015" http://www.doornbusch.net/chronology/ 
Emmerson, Simon (ed.). 1986. The Language of Electroacoustic Music. London: Macmillan.  (cased);  (pbk).
Emmerson, Simon (ed.). 2000. Music, Electronic Media and Culture. Aldershot (UK) and Burlington, Vermont (USA): Ashgate Publishing. .
Gann, Kyle. 2000a. "It's Sound, It's Art, and Some Call It Music." The New York Times (January 9).
Gann, Kyle. 2000. "Music; Electronic Music, Always Current." The New York Times (July 9).
Griffiths, Paul. 1995. Modern Music and After: Directions Since 1945. Oxford: Oxford University Press.  (cloth)  (pbk).
Guérin, François. 1983. Les musiques électroacoustiques. À l'écoute de la musique d'ici 2. Montréal: Centre de musique canadienne. [N.B.: Bibliographical list of Canadian electro-acoustic works.] Without ISBN.
Heifetz, Robin Julian. 1989. On the Wires of Our Nerves: The Art of Electroacoustic Music. Cranbury, New Jersey: Associated University Presses. .
Kahn, Douglas. 2001. Noise, Water, Meat: A History of Sound in the Arts. Cambridge, Massachusetts: MIT Press. .
Licata, Thomas (ed.). 2002. Electroacoustic Music: Analytical Perspectives. Contributions to the Study of Music and Dance, 0193-9041; no. 63. Westport, Conn.: Greenwood Press. .
Manning, Peter. 2004. Electronic and Computer Music. Oxford and New York: Oxford University Press.  (hardback)  (pbk).
 Normandeau, Robert. n.d. "Robert Normandeau Interview". Interview with Robert Normandeau On Outsight Radio Hours about electroacoustic compositions and if they are "music".
Roads, Curtis. 1996. The Computer Music Tutorial. Cambridge, Massachusetts: MIT Press.  (cloth)  (pbk).
 Smalley, Denis. 1997. "Spectromorphology: Explaining Sound-Shapes." Organised Sound 2, no. 2:107–126.
 Wishart, Trevor. 1996. On Sonic Art. New and revised edition. Contemporary Music Studies 12. Amsterdam: Harwood Academic Publishers.  (cloth)  (pbk)  (CD).
Wright, Edward. 2010. "Symbiosis: A Portfolio of Work Focusing on the Tensions Between Electroacoustic and Instrumental Music". PhD diss. Bangor: Bangor University.

External links
eContact!. Freely available online, four themed issues published each year by the Canadian Electroacoustic Community.
"Electroacoustic Bibliography" published in eContact! 8.4 – Ressources éducatives / Educational Resources (Montréal: CEC), an annotated list of journals publishing articles related to electroacoustics.

Electronic music genres
Experimental music genres